Basketball at the 1987 Games of the Small States of Europe was held in the Salle Gaston Médecin of Monaco.

Medal summary

Men's tournament
Men's tournament was played by six teams initially divided into two groups of three teams. The two group winners qualified for the final while the two runners-up would play for the bronze medal.

Preliminary round

Group A

Group B

Classification games

5th position game

Bronze medal game

Final

References and external links
Results at the Cypriot Basketball Federation
Malta basketball team at the GSSE
Iceland national basketball team results

1987 in basketball
1987 Games of the Small States of Europe
Basketball at the Games of the Small States of Europe
Basketball in Monaco